Alexander Westerman is an American creative director based in Los Angeles. 

He began his career as an art director in 1991. Where he studied at Ithaca College and New York University.

He is an executive creative director at OpusLA In 2016.

Career
Westerman started out as a prop master and art director. Westerman's experience ranges from television to movie and theater productions. He was an executive in charge of development at Bona Dea Productions, a production executive of The Weissberger Theatre Group, and an assistant to producer Fred Zollo for one year. In 2000, Westerman left his job at Disney to found a start-up called RadicalZoo.   RadicalZoo was to be a destination for independent filmmakers.

RadicalZoo folded in 2003. Westerman joined the staff of Nickelodeon in 2004 and went on to create award-winning sites and applications for the company. Westerman lead the team that created Nicktropolis the award-winning and much loved virtual world. In 2009, Westerman left Nickelodeon to become Creative Director Worldwide Marketing and Communications for Mattel.

In 2007-2008, Westerman created an Adobe Air application as an Adobe launch partner. The application was the first game to be created using the air runtime. The game allows users to engage in a scavenger hunt, collecting jig saw puzzle pieces and assemble and solve the puzzle offline in the Air runtime.

In 2012 Westerman joined Guthy-Renker as head of digital creative.

In 2015 Westerman joined Spark Networks as head of creative.

Westerman is also the publisher of a popular amusement park and roller coaster website; ThrillNetwork.com. ThrillNetwork is large community dedicated to provide news and information about the amusement park industry. The site contains one of the most comprehensive databases of statistical data on almost every park and ride in the world.

Personal life
In the spring of 2014, Westerman married David Gleason, senior vice president of research for E! and Esquire Network.

Early work
Westerman's background is diverse. He was classically trained as a ballet dancer studying at The School of American Ballet in New York. While attending Ithaca College, he choreographed ballets for the dance school, two of which were critical successes: La Belle et la Bete  and Flight of Icarus. In 1989 Burt Supree of the Village Voice reviewed Westerman's performance and choreography as a member of The Saga Dance Company.

{{Quote box
| quote = Westerman caresses a wooden office chair, then balances tilted across it and another chair. He flexes his feet as a little joke, sensitively fondles the skinny chromium leg of the second chair, and, standing, smoothly swings his legs over the chair backs That small, reticent solo was lovely, the most coherent moment of the evening.
|author = Burt Supree
| source = The Village Voice  | align = Left
| width = 50%
}}

At Nickelodeon
Westerman served as Production Director of Nicktropolis''. Nicktropolis is Nickelodeon's massively multiplayer online game and massively multiplayer online role-playing game that is part of Nick.com.

Transformers Game -
A Transformers Game and area, based on the popular Hasbro toys, is being developed. Teams will compete for Nickpoints and prizes. Game players will have to choose which team to join, evil DECEPTICONS or the noble AUTOBOTS? These two opposing teams will battle it out for control of the elusive Energon Cubes. The area will contain brand new rooms, features, and gameplay, this is sure to be the next evolution of games in Nicktropolis.

Involvement with REDCAT Theater
In 2017 Westerman accepted a position on the REDCAT (Roy and Edna Disney/CalArts Theater) COUNCIL having served as a Circle member from 2010-2017. As a council member Westerman has presented the following productions: Christiane Jatahy: What if they went to Moscow? The Wooster Group: THE B-SIDE: “Negro Folklore from Texas State Prisons" A Record Album Interpretation, A PINK CHAIR (In Place of a Fake Antique), Wallace Shawn's The Designated Mourner, The Room by Harold Pinter and The Town Hall Affair.

Awards for associated websites
 Webby Awards 2010 - Online Games - Mattel.com/games
 Webby Awards 2008 - Social Networking - Nicktropolis.com
 Webby Awards 2008 - People's Choice Best Youth Site - Nick.com
 Parents' Choice Award 2008 - Nicktropolis.com
 Parents' Choice Award 2008 - Nick.com
 Webby Award 2007 - People's Choice Best Youth Site - Nick.com
 In 2004, ThrillNetwork.com was named Forbes Summer 2004 Best of the Web Pick.

Selected projects
 Barbie
 Believe.com
 ChristianMingle.com
 Hot Wheels
 JDate
 JLife
 Mattel.com
 Nicktropolis
 Nick.com
 NickMail
 Proactiv
 ThrillNetwork.com
 TurboNick

Selected theater and filmography
 Out of the Box (The Disney Channel: Season 1 and 2)
 Peroxide Passion (T. Michael Film)
 Hit and Runway (Lot 47 Films)
 Surprise (The NY Picture Company)
 Nickelodeon Pilot “BUS # 9” (MTV Networks)
 Frongs for Snakes (The Shooting Gallery)
 The President's Christmas Tree (Shochiku Entertainment)
 Hell's Kitchen (Kushner-Locke Company)
 The Substance of Fire (Miramax)
 Mississippi Burning (Orion Pictures)
 Oleanna (play) (Samuel Goldwyn)
 Naked in New York (New Line Cinema)
 Quiz Show (Hollywood Pictures)
 Broadway Bares VI - Less Is More

References

External links
Official Website

ThrillNetwork.com

1969 births
Living people
American art directors
Creative directors
American LGBT businesspeople
Gay men
LGBT people from New York (state)
Ithaca College alumni
New York University alumni
George School alumni
21st-century American LGBT people